The National Accountability Bureau (abbreviated NAB) is an autonomous and constitutionally established federal institution responsible to build efforts against corruption and prepare critical national economic intelligence assessments against economic terrorism for the Government of Pakistan. It is headed by a chairman Lt Gen (retd) Nazir Ahmed Butt.
 
The NAB is empowered to undertake any necessary prevention and awareness, by all means, in addition to enforcing its operations against economic terrorism and financial crimes. Since it was established by Pervez Musharraf on 16 November 1999, its sphere of operations has been expanded and extended.  The constitution grants power to launch investigations, conduct inquiries, and issues arrest warrants against individuals suspected of financial mismanagement, economic terrorism, corruption (all in private-sector, state-sector,  defense-sector, and corporate-sector), and directs cases to the accountability courts.

Established by  Ordinance No. XIX, its powers have been extended to conduct inquiries at higher levels by Article 270AA of the Constitution of Pakistan. With its chief headquarters located in Islamabad, it has four regional offices in the four provinces, as well as the four capital territories of Pakistan.

Organization
The bureau has two principal officers: the Chairman; and the Prosecutor General of Accountability in Pakistan. The Chairman is the head of investigation, and serves a four-year term. Lt-Gen Syed Mohammad Amjad was the first chairman of the bureau. Aftab Sultan is the present chairman of NAB. The Prosecutor General is the head of prosecution, and serves a three-year term. A retired justice Asghar Haider is current Prosecutor General of National Accountability Bureau (NAB).

Performance and notable operations

Financial recoveries
Since its formation, the institution has recovered over ₨. 240 Bn (approximately US$ 4 Bn) from corruption committed by country's elite politicians, bureaucrats, former military officers, and those involved in the white-collar crimes. According to Musharraf the "NAB was created to put the fear of God in the corrupt, as Pakistan was on the brink of being declared a failed state before I came to power."

In its research studies published by NAB in 2011, the institution has recovered ₨. 119.5Bn from bank defaults and provided ₨. 60Bn to restructured the banks. by September 2019

Prosecution and investigations
In 2011, the NAB reported that it has 1791 cases that were under prosecution, out of which, 1093 cases prosecutions were completed.

Infrastructure
In 2013, inducted a large number of officers and conducted their Investigation Training at COMSATS University in Islamabad. The officers, after successful completion of the Seven Months off-job and 2 Months on-job training, were posted to different bureaus within the country. There are various challenges currently faced by NAB, including a slow judicial process, difficulty in collecting prosecutable evidence since the majority of country's public record is not electronically archived or integrated into a central database.

Criticism
The National Accountability Bureau has been criticized by the Supreme Court for mismanagement. Justice Jawad S. Khawaja of the Supreme Court criticized the institution for its practice of 'plea bargain' and described it as 'institutionalized corruption'. Under the said practice the Bureau arrests suspects and negotiates for an out-of-court settlement under which the suspect is made to sign a confession and deposit funds of an amount determined by NAB. Justice Khawaja stated during court proceedings that he believed some NAB officials warn influential suspects before arrest to allow them sufficient time to escape.

The NAB has also been criticised of mismanaging the Broadsheet case including making payments to the wrong person as settlements and been held by the London Court of International Arbitration (LCIA) of 'conspiring' to defraud and financially harm Broadsheet LLC. The follies and incompetency of NAB had cost Pakistan's taxpayer $28 million in payments as damages as well as a loss of face.

List of chairmen

See also 

 Exit Control List
 Ministry of Interior
 National Reconciliation Ordinance

References

External links
Official website

Financial regulation in Pakistan
Politics of Pakistan
Pakistan federal departments and agencies
Business ethics organizations
Anti-corruption agencies
1999 establishments in Pakistan
Government agencies established in 1999
National Accountability Bureau